In enzymology, a linoleate 11-lipoxygenase is an enzyme that catalyzes the chemical reaction

linoleate + O2  (9Z,12Z)-(11S)-11-hydroperoxyoctadeca-9,12-dienoate

Thus, the two substrates of this enzyme are linoleate and O2, whereas its product is (9Z,12Z)-(11S)-11-hydroperoxyoctadeca-9,12-dienoate.

This enzyme belongs to the family of oxidoreductases, specifically those acting on single donors with O2 as oxidant and incorporation of two atoms of oxygen into the substrate (oxygenases). The oxygen incorporated need not be derived from O2.  The systematic name of this enzyme class is linoleate:oxygen 11S-oxidoreductase. This enzyme is also called linoleate dioxygenase, manganese lipoxygenase.  This enzyme participates in linoleic acid metabolism.

References

 
 
 

EC 1.13.11
Enzymes of unknown structure